David Edward Washington (born November 20, 1990) is an American professional baseball first baseman and outfielder for the Winnipeg Goldeyes of the American Association of Professional Baseball. He has played in Major League Baseball (MLB) for the Baltimore Orioles.

Career

St. Louis Cardinals
Washington attended University City High School in San Diego, California and was drafted by the St. Louis Cardinals in the 15th round of the 2009 MLB Draft. He played in the Cardinals organization until 2016.

Baltimore Orioles
Prior to the 2017 season he signed with the Baltimore Orioles. On June 14, 2017, he made his MLB debut, going hitless in a 10-6 Orioles win. He elected free agency on November 6, 2017.

Long Island Ducks
On February 13, 2018, Washington signed with the Long Island Ducks of the Atlantic League of Professional Baseball. He re-signed with the team for the 2019 season, and became a free agent following the season.

Milwaukee Milkmen
On February 3, 2020, Washington signed with the Milwaukee Milkmen of the American Association. Washington won the American Association championship with the Milkmen in 2020. On March 22, 2021, Washington re-signed with the Milkmen.

Winnipeg Goldeyes
On January 6, 2022, Washington was traded to the Winnipeg Goldeyes of the American Association in exchange for RHP Tyler Smith and a player to be named later.

References

External links

1990 births
Living people
African-American baseball players
Baseball players from San Diego
Major League Baseball first basemen
Major League Baseball outfielders
Baltimore Orioles players
Gulf Coast Cardinals players
Johnson City Cardinals players
Batavia Muckdogs players
State College Spikes players
Peoria Chiefs players
Palm Beach Cardinals players
Springfield Cardinals players
Memphis Redbirds players
Naranjeros de Hermosillo players
American expatriate baseball players in Mexico
Norfolk Tides players
Long Island Ducks players
Milwaukee Milkmen players
21st-century African-American sportspeople
Águilas de Mexicali players